The Henderson Commercial Historic District is the historic business district of Henderson, Minnesota, United States.  It comprises 12 contributing properties built from 1874 to about 1905 around Henderson's main intersection.  It was listed as a historic district on the National Register of Historic Places in 1988 for its local significance in the themes of architecture and exploration/settlement.  The district was nominated for being a well-preserved link to Henderson's development as an agriculturally-focused river town and Sibley County's initial county seat.

See also
 National Register of Historic Places listings in Sibley County, Minnesota

References

Buildings and structures in Sibley County, Minnesota
Central business districts in the United States
Commercial buildings on the National Register of Historic Places in Minnesota
Historic districts on the National Register of Historic Places in Minnesota
Italianate architecture in Minnesota
National Register of Historic Places in Sibley County, Minnesota
Queen Anne architecture in Minnesota